The Hitchhiker's Guide to the Galaxy is the first book in the Hitchhiker's Guide to the Galaxy comedy science fiction "trilogy of five books" by Douglas Adams, with a sixth book written by Eoin Colfer. The novel is an adaptation of the first four parts of Adams's radio series of the same name, centering on the adventures of the only man to survive the destruction of Earth; while roaming outer space, he comes to learn the truth behind Earth's existence. The novel was first published in London on 12 October 1979. It sold 250,000 copies in the first three months.

The namesake of the novel is The Hitchhiker's Guide to the Galaxy, a fictional guide book for hitchhikers (inspired by the Hitch-hiker's Guide to Europe) written in the form of an encyclopaedia.

Plot summary

The novel opens with an introduction describing the human race as a primitive and deeply unhappy species, while also introducing the Hitchhiker's Guide to the Galaxy which provides information on every planet in the galaxy. Earthman Arthur Dent awakes in his home in West Country, England, to discover that the local planning council is trying to demolish his house to build a bypass and lies down in front of the bulldozer to stop it. His friend Ford Prefect convinces the lead bureaucrat Mr. Prosser to lie down in front of the bulldozer for Arthur so that he can take Arthur to the local pub. The construction crew begins demolishing the house anyway, but stop when a fleet of alien spaceships arrives on Earth undetected by human space agencies. The Vogons, a callous race of civil servants running the fleet, announce that they have come to demolish Earth to make way for a hyperspace expressway, and promptly destroy the planet. Ford and Arthur survive by hitching a ride on the spaceship, much to Arthur's amazement. Ford reveals to Arthur he is an alien researcher for the Hitchhiker's Guide to the Galaxy, from a small planet in the vicinity of Betelgeuse who has been posing as an out-of-work actor from Guildford for 15 years, and this was why they were able to hitch a ride on the alien ship.  They are quickly discovered by the Vogons, who torture them by forcing them to listen to their poetry and then toss them out of an airlock.

Meanwhile Zaphod Beeblebrox, Ford's "semi-cousin" and the President of the Galaxy, steals the spaceship Heart of Gold at its unveiling with his human companion, Trillian. The Heart of Gold is enabled with an "Infinite Improbability Drive" that allows it to travel instantaneously to any point in space by simultaneously passing through every point in the universe at once. However, the Infinite Improbability Drive has a side effect of causing impossible coincidences to occur in the physical universe.  One of these improbable events happens when Arthur and Ford are rescued by the Heart of Gold as it travels using the Infinite Improbability Drive. Zaphod takes his passengers —-- Arthur, Ford, a depressed robot named Marvin, and Trillian -— to a legendary planet known as Magrathea. Magrathea was said to have been a planet whose inhabitants specialized in custom-building planets for others, but vanished after becoming so rich that the rest of the galaxy became poor. Although Ford initially doubts that the planet is Magrathea, the planet's computers send them warning messages to leave before firing two nuclear missiles at the Heart of Gold. Arthur inadvertently saves them by activating the Infinite Improbability Drive improperly, causing the Heart of Gold to remain in Magrathea and for the missiles to transform into a sperm whale and a bowl of petunias. The whale, which unsuccessfully tries to make sense of its existence as it falls to the surface, opens a passage underground on its impact. As the ship lands, Trillian's pet mice Frankie and Benjy escape.

On Magrathea, Zaphod, Ford, and Trillian venture down to the planet's interior while leaving Arthur and Marvin outside. Arthur is met by a resident of Magrathea, a man named Slartibartfast, who explains that the Magratheans have been in stasis to wait out an economic recession. The Magratheans temporarily reawakened to reconstruct a second version of Earth commissioned by mice, who were in fact the most intelligent species on Earth.  Slartibartfast brings Arthur to Magrathea's planet construction facility, and shows Arthur that in the distant past, a race of "hyperintelligent, pan-dimensional beings" created a supercomputer named Deep Thought to determine the answer to the "Ultimate Question to Life, the Universe, and Everything." Two philosophers representing a trade association, Majikthise and Vroomfondel, arrived and complained that the computer would remove uncertainty and end their jobs and demanded its deactivation. However, Deep Thought revealed that it would take 7.5 million years to complete its calculations and reasoned that during that time they could argue over what the computer's answer will be. 7.5 million years later the philosophers' descendants asked Deep Thought for the answer, which it announced was the number 42 -- an answer which made no sense. Deep Thought then explained to its creators that the answer made no sense to them because they didn't know what the "Ultimate Question" had been in the first place, so he suggested designing an even greater computer to determine what the Ultimate Question was. This computer was actually the planet Earth, which was constructed by the Magratheans, and it was five minutes away from finishing its task and figuring out the Ultimate Question when the Vogons destroyed it. The hyperintelligent superbeings participated in the program as mice, performing experiments on humans while pretending to be experimented on.

Slartibartfast takes Arthur to see his friends, who are at a feast hosted by Trillian's pet mice. They reject the idea of building a new Earth to start the process over, because they have decided Arthur's brain likely contains the Ultimate Question, and so a new Earth would not be needed. They offer to buy Arthur's brain, leading to a fight when he declines. Zaphod saves Arthur from having his brain removed as police from the planet Blagulon Kappa arrive to arrest Zaphod.  The police corner Zaphod, Arthur, Ford and Trillian, and the situation seems desperate as they are trapped behind a computer bank that is about to explode from the officers' weapons firing.  However, the police officers suddenly die when their life-support systems short-circuit. Suspicious, Ford discovers on the surface that Marvin became bored and explained his view of the universe to the police officers' spaceship, causing it to commit suicide. The five leave Magrathea and decide to go to The Restaurant at the End of the Universe.

Illustrated edition

The Illustrated Hitchhiker's Guide to the Galaxy is a specially designed book made in 1994. It was first printed in the United Kingdom by Weidenfeld & Nicolson and in the United States by Harmony Books (who sold it for $42.00). It is an oversized book, and came in silver-foil "holographic" covers in both the UK and US markets. It features the first appearance of the 42 Puzzle, designed by Adams himself, a photograph of Adams and his literary agent Ed Victor as the two space cops, and many other designs by Kevin Davies, who has participated in many Hitchhiker's related projects since the stage productions in the late 1970s. Davies himself appears as Prosser. This edition is out of print – Adams bought up many remainder copies and sold them, autographed, on his website.

In other media

Audiobook adaptations
There have been three audiobook recordings of the novel. The first was an abridged edition, recorded in the mid-1980s by Stephen Moore, best known for playing the voice of Marvin the Paranoid Android in the radio series, LP adaptations and in the TV series. In 1990, Adams himself recorded an unabridged edition for Dove Audiobooks, later re-released by New Millennium Audio  in the United States and available from BBC Audiobooks in the United Kingdom. Also by arrangement with Dove, ISIS Publishing Ltd produced a numbered exclusive edition signed by Douglas Adams in 1994. To tie-in with the 2005 film, actor Stephen Fry, the film's voice of the Guide, recorded a second abridged edition.

Television series 

The popularity of the radio series gave rise to a six-episode television series, directed and produced by Alan J. W. Bell, which first aired on BBC 2 in January and February 1981. It employed many of the actors from the radio series and was based mainly on the radio versions of Fits the First through Sixth. A second series was at one point planned, with a storyline, according to Alan Bell and Mark Wing-Davey that would have come from Adams's abandoned Doctor Who and the Krikkitmen project (instead of simply making a TV version of the second radio series). However, Adams got into disputes with the BBC (accounts differ: problems with budget, scripts, and having Alan Bell involved are all offered as causes), and the second series was never made. Elements of Doctor Who and the Krikkitmen were instead used in the third novel, Life, the Universe and Everything.

The main cast was the same as the original radio series, except for David Dixon as Ford Prefect instead of McGivern, and Sandra Dickinson as Trillian instead of Sheridan.

Film adaptation

The Hitchhiker's Guide to the Galaxy was adapted into a science fiction comedy film directed by Garth Jennings and released on 28 April 2005 in the UK, Australia and New Zealand, and on the following day in the United States and Canada. It was rolled out to cinemas worldwide during May, June, July, August and September.

The deliberately misnamed Hitchhiker's Guide to the Galaxy "Trilogy" consists of six books (a hexalogy). Although the series was called a trilogy by readers, the word "trilogy" does not appear on the cover of the first three books and was not used until the publication of the fourth one. The first five books of the series were written by Adams: 

 The Hitchhiker's Guide to the Galaxy (1979)
 The Restaurant at the End of the Universe (1980) 
 Life, the Universe and Everything (1982) 
 So Long, and Thanks for All the Fish (1984) 
 Mostly Harmless (1992) 

On 16 September 2008 it was announced that Irish author Eoin Colfer would continue the series with a sixth novel. This book, entitled And Another Thing..., was published in October 2009, on the 30th anniversary of the publication of the original novel.

Reception
Greg Costikyan reviewed The Hitchhiker's Guide to the Galaxy in Ares Magazine #6 and commented that "The Hitchhiker's Guide is written with superb English wit, far more humorous than any American sitcom." The Pequod rated the book a 9.5 (out of 10.0) and called it "an ingeniously silly sci-fi satire... It may not add up to much, but the jokes keep coming fast and furiously, and its enormous cultural influence (“Don’t Panic,” etc.) proves to be well-earned."

Legacy
The "Babel fish", a creature used in the novel that feeds on brainwaves and can instantly translate alien languages, inspired the name of Babel Fish, the first free online language translator, which launched in 1997.

Radiohead's song "Paranoid Android" (1997) was named after Marvin's nickname, and the album it appears on, OK Computer, is part of a line spoken by Zaphod to Eddie, the Heart of Gold's computer.

The Trillian instant messaging app (2000–) was named after a character of the series.

Towel Day is celebrated every year on 25 May as a tribute to Douglas Adams by his fans. On this day, fans openly carry a towel with them to demonstrate their appreciation for Adams and the book series. The commemoration was first held 25 May 2001, two weeks after Adams' death on 11 May.

When Elon Musk's Tesla Roadster was launched into space on the maiden flight of the Falcon Heavy rocket in February 2018, it had the words DON'T PANIC on the dashboard display and carried amongst other items a copy of the novel and a towel.

In 2022, the novel was included on the "Big Jubilee Read" list of 70 books by Commonwealth authors, selected to celebrate the Platinum Jubilee of Elizabeth II.

The novel's popularity (or the entire Hitchhikers franchise) has contributed to many homages and references involving the number 42, ranging from numerous mentions in pop culture 

to frequent mentions of the novel whenever the number 42 is addressed in Western media.

Awards
 Number one on the Sunday Times bestseller list (1979)
 Author received the "Golden Pan" (From his publishers for reaching the 1,000,000th book sold) (1984)
 Waterstone's Books/Channel Four's list of the 'One Hundred Greatest Books of the Century', at number 24. (1996)
 BBC's "Big Read", an attempt to find the "Nation's Best-loved book", ranked it number four. (2003)

See also

 Spelling of Hitchhiker's Guide for variations in the spelling of the title.
 H2g2, a collaborative encyclopedia project started by Douglas Adams before Wikipedia existed

References

External links
 Hitchhikers Guide easter egg in Wolfram Alpha

1979 British novels
1979 debut novels
1979 science fiction novels
British comedy novels
British novels adapted into films
British science fiction novels
Bureaucracy in fiction
Comic science fiction novels
Debut science fiction novels
English novels
Novels by Douglas Adams
Novels set in England
Novels set on fictional planets
Pan Books books
The Hitchhiker's Guide to the Galaxy novels